is a Japanese politician serving in the House of Representatives in the Diet (national legislature) as an independent. A native of Sakai, Sashima District, Ibaraki Prefecture and a graduate of Nihon University, he was elected to the House of Representatives for the first time as an independent in 1976.

After winning 14 elections in a row without a single defeat at the polls, he lost to Keiko Nagaoka in the election of October 21, 2021.

Biography

Early life
Born in Sakai Machi, Ibaraki Prefecture, his birth name was Shin Nakamura (中村伸). He graduated from Keimei Gakuen High School, a Protestant school in Akishima, Tokyo. In 1972, he graduated from the Nihon University College of Law; prior to graduating, he began working in the office of Kakuei Tanaka, serving as Tanaka's private secretary.

First election and name change
In the 1976 Japanese general election, running as an independent, Nakamura was elected to the House of Representatives for Ibaraki District 3. For the election, he had changed his legal name to Kishiro Nakamura ("Junior"), and thus inherited the support network developed over the years by his father, Kishiro Nakamura ("Senior").

Notes

References

External links 
 Official website

|-

|-

1949 births
Living people
Politicians from Ibaraki Prefecture
Nihon University alumni
Members of the House of Representatives (Japan)
Ministers of Construction of Japan
21st-century Japanese politicians